Frank Kurt Claude Belfrage (born 13 March 1942) is a Swedish economist and diplomat who was State Secretary for Foreign Affairs between 2006 and 2014, heading the Ministry for Foreign Affairs under then Minister for Foreign Affairs Carl Bildt. He was previously Ambassador of Sweden to the European Union from 1994 to 1999 and Ambassador of Sweden to France from 2001 to 2006.

Belfrage is a member of the noble Belfrage family. He is the son of diplomat Kurt-Allan Belfrage and his wife, Renée France Paule Puaux. He is the nephew of Leif Belfrage who was State Secretary for Foreign Affairs from 1956 to 1967. He is married and has four daughters.

Belfrage was part of the 2016 SVT documentary "Springnotan" revealing to the Swedish people how some of their political leaders hid money from tax authorities. Belfrage used a temporary and questionable tax amnesty, avoiding imprisonment, where his name was revealed.

Awards
Commander of the Legion of Honour
H. M. The King's Medal, 12th size gold medal on Seraphim Order ribbon

See also
List of people named in the Panama Papers

References

External links
 Government Offices of Sweden: State Secretary for Foreign Affairs Frank Belfrage

1942 births
Living people
Politicians from Stockholm
Swedish people of Scottish descent
Stockholm School of Economics alumni
Ambassadors of Sweden to Saudi Arabia
Ambassadors of Sweden to Oman
Ambassadors of Sweden to Yemen
Ambassadors of Sweden to France